Jaltenango de la Paz is a town and seat of the municipality of Ángel Albino Corzo, in the state of Chiapas, southern Mexico.

References

Populated places in Chiapas